Goniolimon, sometimes called the statices, are a genus of flowering plants in the leadwort and  plumbago family Plumbaginaceae, native to northern Africa, southern Europe, western and central Asia, Siberia, Mongolia and China. Low-lying perennial shrubs, some species are cultivated as ground covers.

Species
Currently accepted species include:

Goniolimon africanum Buzurovic, Bogdanovic & Brullo
Goniolimon besserianum (Schult. ex Rchb.) Kusn.
Goniolimon callicomum (C.A.Mey.) Boiss.
Goniolimon caucasicum Klokov
Goniolimon dalmaticum (C.Presl) Rchb.
Goniolimon dshungaricum (Regel) O.Fedtsch. & B.Fedtsch.
Goniolimon elatum (Fisch. ex Spreng.) Boiss.
Goniolimon eximium (Schrenk) Boiss.
Goniolimon glaberrimum (Aiton) Klokov
Goniolimon gorczakovskyi Knjaz.
Goniolimon graminifolium (Aiton) Boiss.
Goniolimon heldreichii Halácsy
Goniolimon incanum (L.) Hepper
Goniolimon italicum Tammaro, Pignatti & Frizzi
Goniolimon krylovii A.V.Grebenjuk
Goniolimon orthocladum Rupr.
Goniolimon rubellum (S.G.Gmel.) Klokov
Goniolimon salicorniaceum (F.Muell.) Christenh. & Byng → Muellerolimon salicorniaceum (F. Muell.) Lincz.
Goniolimon sartorii Boiss.
Goniolimon sewerzowii Herder
Goniolimon speciosum (L.) Boiss.
Goniolimon tataricum (L.) Boiss.

References

Plumbaginaceae
Caryophyllales genera
Taxa named by Pierre Edmond Boissier